During the 1967–68 Scottish football season, Celtic competed in the Scottish Division One.

Results

Scottish Division One

Scottish Cup

Scottish League Cup

European Cup

Intercontinental Cup

Glasgow Cup

See also
Nine in a row

References

Scottish football championship-winning seasons
Celtic F.C. seasons
Celtic